The following is a list of winners of the National Film Award (Silver Lotus Award) for best male Playback singer. The award was first granted to Mahendra Kapoor in 1967. The singers whose performances have won awards have worked in nine major languages: Hindi (19 awards), Malayalam (9 awards), Bengali (7 awards), Tamil, Telugu, Marathi and Kannada (4 each), and Punjabi (1 award).

The singer with the most awards in this category is K. J. Yesudas with eight wins for three languages (Malayalam, Telugu and Hindi), followed by S. P. Balasubrahmanyam who won six times for four languages;Telugu, Hindi, Kannada and Tamil. Udit Narayan and Shankar Mahadevan follow next, winning three awards each. The singers Manna Dey, Hemanta Kumar Mukhopadhyay, M. G. Sreekumar, Hariharan have bagged this award twice.

Multiple winners

Recipients

See also 
 National Film Award for Best Female Playback Singer

References

External links 
 Official Page for Directorate of Film Festivals, India
 National Film Awards Archives

Male Playback Singer
Indian music awards
Film music awards